Yvan Watremez (born 21 April 1989) is a French rugby union player. His position is Prop and he currently plays for Montpellier Hérault in the Top 14. He began his career with Biarritz Olympique before moving to Montpellier in 2012. He made his international debut during France's 2012 tour of Argentina.

References

External links
 Yvan Watremez on espn.co.uk
  Yvan Watremez on lnr.fr

1989 births
Living people
French rugby union players
People from Foix
Biarritz Olympique players
Montpellier Hérault Rugby players
Rugby union props
France international rugby union players
Sportspeople from Ariège (department)